Jordan is an electoral district of the Legislative Assembly in the Australian state of Queensland. It was created in the 2017 redistribution. It was named after politician Vi Jordan, second female Member of the Queensland Legislative Assembly.

Based on the area between Ipswich and Logan, Jordan consists of the suburbs of Gailes, Carole Park, Camira, Brookwater, Augustine Heights, Springfield, Greenbank, New Beith, Lyons and Undullah.

From results of the 2015 election, Jordan was estimated to be a safe seat for the Labor Party with a margin of 13.5%.

Members for Jordan

Election results

See also
 Electoral districts of Queensland
 Members of the Queensland Legislative Assembly by year
 :Category:Members of the Queensland Legislative Assembly by name

References

Electoral districts of Queensland